Rosamond is a feminine given name. 

It may also refer to:

Places:
Rosamond, California, a census-designated place
Rosamond, Illinois, an unincorporated community
Rosamond Township, Christian County, Illinois
Rosamond Hills, California, a mountain range
Rosamond Lake, California
Rosamond Skypark, California, a residential airpark and public-use airport

People:
Bennett Rosamond (1833-1910), Canadian manufacturer and politician
Christine Rosamond (1947-1994), American painter and artist
Frances A. Rosamond, Australian computer scientist

See also
Rosamund (disambiguation)
Rosamunde (disambiguation)